Freedent is a gum manufactured by Wrigley's. Freedent was first introduced in the US and UK in 1975 and is marketed as the gum that "won't stick to most dental work (or braces)."  Freedent comes in eight flavors: Winterfresh, Peppermint, Spearmint, Bubble Gum, Fruit, Strawberry, Eucalyptus, and Blueberry. It also comes in two package sizes: single packs containing 15 sticks of gum, and multi-packs containing 8 packs of 5 sticks each. Sugar-free versions of Freedent are also available in several countries, including France.

History
Freedent was first developed by the Wrigley Company after receiving a large amount of feedback from customers who had issues with regular gum sticking to their dental work. Freedent was designed using a new type of gum base that would not stick to most dental work, allowing those who had trouble chewing traditional gum to chew it with minimal sticking. At the time of its debut in 1975, it was the first new major Wrigley's brand to be released in the US in 53 years.

Canada
In 2001, Freedent added a pellet package as the Canadian version of Orbit White.  In the mid-2000s, the pellet version was renamed Freedent Total.  By June 2006, Wrigley's had withdrawn the Freedent Total line from Canada and replaced it with Excel White.   Freedent continues its Canadian sales in sticks only, but with similar packaging to the American Orbit and the Canadian Extract.

Netherlands 
The gum can be still found in most Dutch shops in a variety of flavours. It is sometimes used as a cheaper stock alternative to Orbit.

References

Products introduced in 1975
Wrigley Company brands
Chewing gum